is a Japanese manga series written and illustrated by Hajime Yamamura. It was serialized in Shogakukan's seinen manga magazine Monthly Sunday Gene-X from December 2006 to February 2013, with its chapters collected in twelve tankōbon volumes. An anime adaptation aired from July to September 2011.

Plot
Kyōhei, a university student, has moved to Tokyo from his old village to try to forget his unpleasant memories of certain events. One evening he goes on a group date with his friends, including his old neighbor and fellow student, Hibino. Later that night, he and Hibino discover a dead, bloody body in an elevator. Unexpectedly, his younger sister, Utao, arrives at his apartment with her kakashi (an ancient wooden "god" controlled by the mind) that was once his kakashi, and tells him that his former friend Aki and his own kakashi are responsible. After their encounter with Aki, Hibino learns that her father is from "Karakami" village, the same village as Kyōhei, Aki and Utao and the origin of the kakashi. She later accompanies them to "Karakami" village, and finds out many things about the village and the kakashi, as well as Kyōhei, Aki, and Utao.

Characters

Kyōhei comes from the wealthy Kuga family, who has left his hometown and his duties as a "Seki" to live his own life in Tokyo. He was the partner of the doll, Kukuri, before it was entrusted to his younger sister, Utao. Late in the anime it is revealed that Kyōhei is the strongest Seki ever, with much greater power than any Seki before: he is able to "open" Kukuri's left hand, which has the power to absorb, amplify and reflect energy beams, something that no other Seki has been able to do in over a millennium.

Utao is Kyōhei's younger sister and the current partner of Kukuri. She comes to Tokyo out of concern that Aki would come for her brother. Her fears are confirmed and, after destroying Kyōhei's apartment in a confrontation with Aki, she moves into Hibino's house with her brother. She starts working at the Shiba family's café to help defray their living expenses and also begins training to improve her control over Kukuri's movements. She seems to have a brother complex towards Kyohei to the point of becoming angry with any other girl who approaches him.

Hibino is a beautiful young woman who attends the same university as Kyōhei, who has had a crush on her since they met, but is unaware of her own feelings for him. She has been asked out on dates by many of her male classmates, but declined all of them. She eventually becomes Kyōhei's girlfriend. Despite her father coming from the same village as Kyōhei's family, she is unaware of its secrets until she invites Kyōhei and Utao (whose apartment was destroyed) to live with her and her father. According to Aki, Kyōhei's affection for her comes from Hibino's resemblance with a certain teacher from their childhood.

A former childhood friend of Kyōhei's and another Seki, who was imprisoned several years before the beginning of the storyline after he had used his kakushi, Kuremitsuha, to kill in anger over the death of their teacher with whom he had a romantic relationship. He escapes from confinement after learning that Kyōhei has left the village and sets out for Tokyo to confront him, claiming that both of them are guilty of the same "sin" and that Kyōhei cannot live his life in denial.

A Seki from the Hyūga family. He is the partner of the kakushi, Uwazutsu. He and Kirio are tasked with capturing Aki and bringing him back to the village. He is shown to be protective of Kirio and acts as a father figure to him, as Kirio was separated from his birth family and the head of the Hyūga clan treats him harshly. He also seems to care for Utao and Kyōhei as shown in Episode 12, even though they are from the rival Kuga clan.

Kirio is another Seki who controls the doll, Takemikazuchi. He is actually Utao's younger twin brother who was separated from his family at birth and taken into the Hyūga family's custody in secret. Like his sister, it is said that his ability as a Seki was awakened while he still was in their mother's womb, thus attracting the attention of the Hyūga clan who were looking for a suitable Seki to control their hidden, and most powerful, kakushi, Amaterasu.

The most powerful Seki from the Hyūga family who considers all other Seki, except for Kyōhei, inferior to herself. The reason for this is that when she was a child Kyōhei saved her life by unleashing Kukuri's true power. Since then she has developed an obsessive infatuation for him. She is Kōshirō's cousin and excels in controlling her doll, Magatsuhi, whose special ability is to stop other dolls' movements. Mahiru was unable to retain control of her Doll after it was severely damaged by Kukuri and it went berserk and started using powers that Mahiru had not seen before. Her Doll was then destroyed by Kukuri.

Kyohei and Hibino's eccentric classmate. She is fed up with normalcy and is interested in the supernatural. She was close to giving up because all her leads turned out to be shams but was overjoyed when she discovered the kakashi and forcibly involved herself in the situation. She kidnaps Aki, who later decides to hide out in her apartment.

Media

Manga 
Written and illustrated by Hajime Yamamura, Kamisama Dolls was serialized in Shogakukan's seinen manga magazine Monthly Sunday Gene-X from December 19, 2006, to February 19, 2013. Shogakukan collected its chapters in twelve tankōbon volumes, released from July 19, 2007, to April 19, 2013.

Anime 
Three theme songs are used in the Anime, "Fukanzen Nenshou" (不完全燃焼, lit. Incomplete Combustion) for the opening theme, "Switch ga Haittara" (スイッチが入ったら, lit. When the switch is flipped) for the main ending theme, and "Natsu no Niwa" (夏の庭, lit. "Summer Garden") for Episode 7's ending theme. All three songs are performed by Chiaki Ishikawa.

Episode list

See also
Kamunagara, another manga series by the same author

References

External links

Action anime and manga
Anime series
Anime series based on manga
Brain's Base
Seinen manga
Sentai Filmworks
Shinto in fiction
Shogakukan manga
Supernatural thriller anime and manga
Television shows written by Makoto Uezu
TV Tokyo original programming